The swimming competition at the 1991 South Asian Federation Games  in Colombo, Sri Lanka.

Result

Men's events

Women's events

References

1991 South Asian Games
Swimming at the South Asian Games
Swimming in Sri Lanka